The 2013 James Madison Dukes football team represented James Madison University in the 2013 NCAA Division I FCS football season. They were led by 15th year head coach Mickey Matthews and play their home games at Bridgeforth Stadium and Zane Showker Field. They were a member of the Colonial Athletic Association. They finished the season 6–6, 3–5 in CAA play to finish in a tie for eighth place.

On November 25, head coach Mickey Matthews was fired. He had a record of 109–71 in 15 seasons and won the FCS National Championship in 2004.

Schedule

Source: Schedule

Ranking movements

References

James Madison
James Madison Dukes football seasons
James Madison Dukes football